Ehinabo Omoighe (born March 26, 1994) is a Nigerian-Austrian footballer.

External links
 

1994 births
Living people
Austrian footballers
Floridsdorfer AC players
Association football defenders